George Groeneveld  (born 1940) is a Canadian politician and was a Member of the Legislative Assembly of Alberta representing the constituency of Highwood as a Progressive Conservative.

Early life
Groeneveld was born in Blackie, Alberta. He served as regional director of the Alberta Wheat Pool. In this role, he attended the Canadian International Grains Institute. Groeneveld was Agricore United's first vice-president.

Political career
Groeneveld first sought public office in the 2004 provincial election in the constituency of Highwood. In that election, he received 64% of the vote. In 2006, following the leadership race for the Progressive Conservative Association of Alberta, newly elected Premier Ed Stelmach appointed Groeneveld as Minister of Agriculture and Food. In the 2008 provincial election that followed, Groeneveld secured his position as MLA for Highwood with 65% of the vote. In March 2008, he was reappointed as Minister of Agriculture and Rural Development.

Personal life
Groeneveld is married to Judith. The couple has four children together, Sandra, Brett, Tyler, and Marla. He is an active member of his community and Gladys United Church.

Election results

References

Progressive Conservative Association of Alberta MLAs
Members of the United Church of Canada
Living people
Year of birth uncertain
Members of the Executive Council of Alberta
21st-century Canadian politicians
1940 births